The Roaring River is a  tributary of the Fall River in Larimer County, Colorado.  The river's source is Crystal Lake in the Mummy Range of Rocky Mountain National Park The river flows through Lawn Lake before a confluence with the Fall River in Horseshoe Park. The collapse of the Lawn Lake Dam in 1982 scoured the river's channel and deposited an alluvial fan of debris in Horseshoe Park.

See also
 List of rivers of Colorado

References

Rivers of Rocky Mountain National Park
Rivers of Larimer County, Colorado